is a Japanese former tennis player. She turned professional in 1997, and retired in 2006.

Career
2000 was the first year in which she finished in the WTA top 100 (No. 72). At the US Open that year, she defeated Patty Schnyder, a top-50 player. She also reached her first WTA Tour quarterfinal that year at the Princess Cup at Tokyo, defeating Ai Sugiyama and losing to Monica Seles. She also represented Japan at the Sydney Olympics.
In 2003, she reached her first WTA singles final. In 2004, she reached her second career singles final in Hobart, as well as her first Grand Slam quarterfinal at the US Open.
In April 2005, Asagoe reached her career-high singles ranking of world No. 21. In May of the following year, she reached her career-high doubles ranking (13th).

Asagoe appeared in one WTA Tour final, in Auckland 2003, where she lost to Katarina Srebotnik in three sets. Asagoe held a 4–0 lead in the second set when Srebotnik took an injury timeout. From there, Strebotnik played "all in" tennis and won the match, in what was an agonising result for Asagoe.

Her most memorable match was a second-round marathon at Wimbledon 2003, when her stressed-out opponent, Daniela Hantuchová, melted down well on the way to what looked like a routine two-set win. Eventually, after nearly three hours, Asagoe won the contest 12–10 in the third set.

She played doubles with Katarina Srebotnik. At the 2006 Australian Open, they reached the semifinals by beating Cara Black/Rennae Stubbs 6–3, 4–6, 6–0. They lost to eventual champions Yan/Zheng in the semifinals.

At the US Open that same year, she lost her first-round match in straight sets to Jelena Kostanić. She had announced, the US Open would be her last tournament. In doubles, with Akiko Morigami, they won their first-round match 6–1, 6–3, and they were to play against the 14th seeds, Marion Bartoli/Shahar Peer. Bartoli/Peer were up 6–4, 5–2, before Shinobu and Akiko won four straight games to make it 6–5. They held many set points at 6–5, but could not convert, thus forcing a tiebreaker; they were down 2–6, but won six straight points, thus taking the tiebreaker, saving four straight match points. They took the final set 6–4.

Asagoe retired at the 2006 US Open, after losing her third-round doubles match (with Morigami) to the world's top-ranked team Lisa Raymond/Samantha Stosur.

Significant finals

Olympic games

Doubles: 1 bronze final

WTA career finals

Singles: 3 (3 runner-ups)

Doubles: 12 (8 titles, 4 runner-ups)

ITF Circuit finals

Singles: 15 (9–6)

Doubles: 19 (10-9)

External links
 
 
 

1976 births
Living people
Japanese female tennis players
Olympic tennis players of Japan
Sportspeople from Hyōgo Prefecture
Tennis players at the 2000 Summer Olympics
Tennis players at the 2004 Summer Olympics
Asian Games medalists in tennis
Tennis players at the 2002 Asian Games
Universiade medalists in tennis
Medalists at the 2002 Asian Games
Asian Games silver medalists for Japan
Asian Games bronze medalists for Japan
Universiade gold medalists for Japan
Universiade bronze medalists for Japan
Medalists at the 1995 Summer Universiade
Medalists at the 1997 Summer Universiade
20th-century Japanese women
21st-century Japanese women